Soldier's Monument may refer to:

United States

Connecticut 
Soldiers' Monument in Bristol, Connecticut, a brownstone obelisk in West Cemetery (1866)

Illinois 
Soldier's Monument (Byron, Illinois), in Ogle County (1866)
The Soldiers' Monument (Oregon, Illinois), in the Oregon Commercial Historic District (1916)

Iowa 
Soldier's Monument (Davenport, Iowa), in the College Square Historic District (1880)

Kansas 
Soldiers' Monument (Osawatomie, Kansas), listed on the National Register of Historic Places in Miami County, Kansas

Kentucky 
Colored Soldiers Monument in Frankfort, Franklin County
Confederate Soldiers Martyrs Monument in Eminence, Henry County
Confederate Soldier Monument in Caldwell Caldwell County
Confederate Soldier Monument in Lexington, Fayette County
Unknown Confederate Soldier Monument in Horse Cave, Hart County

Massachusetts 
Soldiers' monument (Dover, Massachusetts), Dover, Massachusetts, 1910

New Mexico 
Soldiers' Monument (Santa Fe, New Mexico), in Santa Fe County (1866-8)

New York 
Washington Avenue Soldier's Monument and Triangle, Rockland County (1921)

Pennsylvania 
Soldiers' National Monument, in the Gettysburg National Cemetery (1869), Gettysburg, Pennsylvania

See also
Soldiers' and Sailors' Monument (disambiguation)